The Cuerdale Hoard is a hoard of more than 8,600 items, including silver coins, English and Carolingian jewellery, hacksilver and ingots. It was discovered on 15 May 1840 on the southern bank of a bend of the River Ribble, in an area called Cuerdale near Preston, Lancashire, England. The Cuerdale Hoard is one of the largest Viking silver hoards ever found, four times larger than its nearest rival in Britain or Ireland, according to Richard Hall. In weight and number of pieces, it is second only to the Spillings Hoard found on Gotland, Sweden.

The coins in the hoard are from three sources, represented in the proportions 5:1:1. Viking kingdoms of eastern England are represented in the largest portion; the other two portions are of Alfred's Kingdom of Wessex and of coins from foreign sources, which include Byzantine, Scandinavian, Islamic, Papal, North Italian and Carolingian mintings, many of the last from Aquitaine perhaps, Richard Hall suggests, acquired there in the Viking raids of 898.

Discovery
The hoard was found by a group of workmen repairing the embankment of the river. It was in a lead box, which shows evidence of the hoard having been parcelled into small bags or packages. After discovery it was quickly recovered by the landowner's bailiffs, ensuring it remained together, though the workmen managed to keep a coin each. The remainder was declared treasure trove and handed to Queen Victoria as the Duke of Lancaster.

The Duchy passed it to the British Museum in London, where the bulk of it remains today. About 60 items selected from the hoard are held and displayed by the Ashmolean Museum in Oxford. Some coins minted at Quentovic in northern France (possibly near present-day Étaples) are held by the Château-musée de Boulogne-sur-Mer.

Origins

It is believed the coins were buried between 903 and 910, soon after the Vikings had been expelled from Dublin in 902. At this time the Ribble Valley was an important Viking route between the Irish Sea and York. The presence of large numbers of newly minted Norse coins from York and large amounts of Irish Norse bullion leads experts to believe this may have been a war chest belonging to Irish Norse exiles intending to reoccupy Dublin from the Ribble Estuary, but there have also been many other theories about its ownership and purpose.

In 1966 the numismatist M. Banks suggested that the hoard was not even buried by Vikings, although it was Viking treasure, or much of it was. Banks suggested that the Cuerdale Hoard might have been a gift to English churches suffering persecution in the areas called the Danelaw that were occupied by pagan Vikings. Since so many of the coins were apparently minted across the Channel, said Banks, they were probably a contribution from the Frankish Christians to their English brothers.

Many such mysteries surround the Cuerdale trove. Little archaeological investigation has yet been done of the site of Cuerdale Hall. Such an investigation might reveal why the hoard was buried in that location. The orientation of the old hall and roads and fields to the south suggests that a ford or bridge existed near the present site of Cuerdale Hall. Rob Curedale, a descendant of the De Keuerdale family, proposed an alternative theory that the hoard was buried by Sir Thomas de Molyneux who occupied Cuerdale Hall and raised an army of several thousand with help from Irish nobility to support Richard II. The treasure could have been several hundred years old when brought from an unknown location in Ireland at the direction of Richard II and buried at Cuerdale.

Other theories include that the silver was intended for a casting works in the vicinity. Remains of fortifications and moat suggest that a larger building once occupied the present site of Cuerdale Hall.

Folklore
The existence of the hoard may have been known long before its eventual rediscovery. A local Preston tradition said that anyone who stood on the south bank of the Ribble at Walton-le-Dale, and looked upriver to Ribchester, would be within sight of the richest treasure in England. The Ribchester Helmet had been found as part of a Roman hoard in 1796.

Contexts
The presence of the Vikings can be seen today in Preston through numerous place names. The Cuerdale Hoard is an example of the rich archaeology that exists around the Preston area and includes evidence of prehistoric and significant Roman history.

The hoard was number 9 in the list of British archaeological finds selected by experts at the British Museum for the 2003 BBC Television documentary Our Top Ten Treasures presented by Adam Hart-Davis.

The original report

(Courtesy of Treasure Hunting Magazine)

See also
Cuerdale
Silverdale Hoard
Vale of York hoard
Mildenhall Treasure
Battle of Brunanburh
Cnut of Northumbria

References

Further reading

External links

British Museum collection
treasurehunting magazine - The Cuerdale Hoard

10th-century artifacts
1840 archaeological discoveries
1840 in England
Archaeological sites in Lancashire
Anglo-Norse England
Anglo-Saxon archaeology
Germanic archaeological artifacts
Collection of the Ashmolean Museum
History of Lancashire
Hoards of jewellery
Medieval European objects in the British Museum
Treasure troves in England
Viking treasure troves
Medieval European metalwork objects
South Ribble